Zych is a Polish surname. Notable people with the surname include:

 Bogusław Zych (1951–1995), Polish fencer
 Gabriela Zych (1941–2010), Polish activist, victim of 2010 Polish Air Force Tu-154 crash
 Józef Zych (born 1938), Polish politician
 Kyle Zych (born 1996), American ice sled hockey player
 Maurycy Zych (1864–1925), Polish novelist and dramatist
 Michał Zych (born 1982), Polish ice dancer
 Tom Zych (born 1940), American politician
 Tony Zych (born 1990), American baseball player
 Sylwester Zych (1950–1989), Polish Catholic priest
 Władysław Zych (1899–1981), Polish paleontologist and acting Delegate for the Soviet-occupied territories of Poland during World War II

Polish-language surnames